is a district located in Rumoi Subprefecture, Hokkaido, Japan.

As of 2004, the district has an estimated population of 5,736 and a density of 15.52 persons per km2. The total area is 369.64 km2.

Town
Mashike

In July 2004, the city of Rumoi, the town of Obira from Rumoi District, and the town of Masahike were supposed to form the South Rumoi Three-Municipality Merger Board, aiming at merging the three, in which case Rumoi and Masahike Districts would cease to exist. However, that hasn't occurred yet whatsoever.

Districts in Hokkaido